The 1947–48 season was the 56th season in Liverpool F.C.'s existence, and ended with the club finishing eleventh in the table.

Goalkeepers

 Charlie Ashcroft
 Ray Minshull
 Cyril Sidlow

Defenders

 Jim Harley
 Laurie Hughes
 Bill Jones
 Ray Lambert
 Bob Paisley
 Stan Palk
 Bernard Ramsden
 Bill Shepherd
 Sam Shields
 Eddie Spicer
 Phil Taylor

Midfielders

 Ken Brierley
 Harry Eastham
 Billy Liddell
 Doug McAvoy
 Alex Muir
 Jimmy Payne
 Robert Priday
 Billy Watkinson
 Bryan Williams

Forwards

 Jack Balmer
 Kevin Baron
 Len Carney
 Cyril Done
 Willie Fagan
 Les Shannon
 Albert Stubbins

Table

Results

First Division

FA Cup

References
 LFC History.net – 1947–48 season
 Liverweb - 1947–48 Season

Liverpool F.C. seasons
Liverpool